The 1948 Segunda División Peruana, the second division of Peruvian football (soccer), was played by eight teams. The tournament winner, Centro Iqueño, was promoted to the Primera División Peruana 1949.

Results

Standings

External links
 La Historia de la Segunda 1948

 

Peruvian Segunda División seasons
Peru2
2